The Aragon autonomous basketball team is the basketball team of Aragon. The team is not affiliated to FIBA, so only plays friendly games.

History
The first appearance of Aragon team was in 2005, in Zaragoza and they were defeated in the overtime by Uruguay. Next year, another friendly game was played this time at Huesca with Lithuania, and the team was defeated again.

Aragon played a total of five games.

Games played

References

External links
Aragonese Federation website

Sports teams in Aragon
Aragon